Jill Naomi Tokuda (born March 3, 1976) is an American businesswoman and politician serving as the U.S representative for Hawaii's 2nd congressional district since 2023. 

Tokuda represented the 24th district in the Hawaii Senate from 2006 to 2018.

Background and education
Tokuda was born and raised in Hawaii. She is a fourth-generation Japanese American.

Tokuda earned her BA in international relations with a minor in Japanese studies from George Washington University.

Political career 
Tokuda first elected to the Hawaii Senate in 2006, running unopposed in the September 23 Democratic primary. She won the November 7 general election with 9,429 votes (55.6%) against Republican nominee Keoki Leong.

Tokuda was reelected in 2010. She was not challenged for renomination and won the November 2 general election with 10,010 votes (56.4%) against Republican nominee Tracy Nakano Bean.

2014: Tokuda was unopposed in the August 9 Democratic primary. She won the November 4 general election with 13,817 votes (70,8%) against Republican nominee Kilomana Michael Danner.

Tokuda did not run for reelection, and instead became a candidate for Lieutenant Governor of Hawaii in 2018. In the August 11 Democratic primary, Tokuda lost to Josh Green.

During the COVID-19 pandemic, Tokuda advised the Hawaii Data Collaborative and helped track progress on federal relief spending.

In 2019, Tokuda was named the executive director of the Nisei Veterans Memorial Center on Maui.

U.S. House of Representatives

Elections

2022 
On November 8, 2022, Tokuda was elected to represent Hawaii's 2nd congressional district in the United States House of Representatives, defeating Republican nominee Joe Akana with 62.2% of the vote to Akana's 35.3%.

Tenure 
During the 2023 Speaker election, Tokuda voted for Hakeem Jeffries for Speaker of the United States House of Representatives on all 15 ballots.

Syria 
In 2023, Tokuda was among 56 Democrats to vote in favor of H.Con.Res. 21 which directed President Joe Biden to remove U.S. troops from Syria within 180 days.

Caucus memberships 

 Congressional Progressive Caucus

Personal Life 

Tokuda is Protestant.

References

External links

Representative Jill Tokuda official U.S. House website
Jill Tokuda for Congress campaign website 
Senator Jill N. Tokuda legislative website 

|-

|-

1976 births
21st-century American politicians
21st-century American women politicians
American Protestants
American women of Japanese descent in politics
Asian-American members of the United States House of Representatives
Christians from Hawaii
Democratic Party Hawaii state senators
Democratic Party members of the United States House of Representatives from Hawaii
Female members of the United States House of Representatives
Hawaii Democrats
Hawaii politicians of Japanese descent
Living people
Members of the United States Congress of Japanese descent
Protestants from Hawaii
Women state legislators in Hawaii
Year of birth missing (living people)